The 1993 European Baseball Championship was held in Stockholm, Sweden between 9–18 July 1993 and was won by the Netherlands. Italy finished as runner-up.

Standings

References
(NL) European Championship Archive at honkbalsite

European Baseball Championship
European Baseball Championship
1993
1993 in Swedish sport
1990s in Stockholm
International sports competitions in Stockholm
July 1993 sports events in Europe